The Brookshire Katy Drainage District (BKDD) is a political subdivision of the state of Texas which oversees the drainage of water within its boundaries. The district has its headquarters in Brookshire, Texas.

References

External links

 Brookshire Katy Drainage District
 Casey, Rick. "The bridge of Waller County." Houston Chronicle. July 15, 2010.
 Map of Brookshire Katy Drainage District boundaries

Government of Texas